Baddeley is a surname, and may refer to:

 Aaron Baddeley, Australian-American golfer
 Alan Baddeley, English professor of psychology
 Angela Baddeley, English actress
 Gavin Baddeley, English reverend and journalist
 Herbert Baddeley, English tennis player
 Hermione Baddeley, British actress
 Frederick Henry Baddeley, geologist
 Jack Baddeley, Australian politician
 John Baddeley (disambiguation)
 John F. Baddeley, British scholar and journalist
 Jon Baddeley, English auctioneer
 Lee Baddeley, Welsh footballer
 M. J. B. Baddeley, English guidebook writer
 Robert Baddeley (actor), English actor
 Sophia Baddeley, English actress
 Steve Baddeley, English badminton player
 Thomas Baddeley (priest)
 Tom Baddeley, English footballer
 Wilfred Baddeley, English tennis player

See also
 Badeley